The Fawcett Association was a trade union representing postal clerks in London.

History
The union was founded in 1890.  It was named after Henry Fawcett, who it considered had been sympathetic to workers when he was Postmaster General.

For most of its existence, the union's general secretary was Wallace Bligh Cheesman, and its chairman was William E. Clery.  They were sacked from the Post Office after they circulated information about candidates in the 1892 general election, and attempted to get them to express support for the union. However, Cheesman remained the union's secretary throughout its existence.

Cheesman decided to work closely with other unions, and in 1893, the Fawcett Association became the first clerical union to affiliate to the Trades Union Congress.  It also joined the United Government Workers' Federation, and formed the National Joint Committee of Postal and Telegraph Associations in 1897, with the Postmen's Federation, Postal and Telegraph Clerks' Association and United Kingdom Postal Clerks' Association.

The union was represented at the founding meeting of the Labour Representation Committee (LRC).  Clery was adopted as an LRC candidate in 1901, but was also adopted as a Liberal-Labour candidate for Deptford.  This proved controversial, and he did not ultimately stand under either label.

Membership of the union grew steadily, reaching 3,750 by 1904.  The Postal Bagmen's Association and the Women Sorters' Association affiliated to the Fawcett Association in 1906.  In 1919, it merged with the Postmen's Federation and the Postal and Telegraph Clerks' Association, forming the Union of Post Office Workers.

Election results
The union co-sponsored a Labour Party candidate at the 1918 UK general election:

Leadership

General Secretaries
1889: L. Leader
1890: William E. Clery
1890: H. Hall
1890: William E. Clery
1891: J. Guest
1892: Wallace Bligh Cheesman

Chairs
1889: J. H. Williams
1893: William E. Clery
1903: G. W. Gains
1905: A. J. Mosedale
1908: E. J. Nevill
1911: Charles Ammon

Treasurer
1889: H. Groves
1899: W. E. Smith
1902: J. Fitzgerald
1917: C. P. Randall

References

Trade unions established in 1890
Trade unions disestablished in 1919
Postal trade unions